"Feel Good Inc." is a song by British virtual band Gorillaz featuring American hip-hop group De La Soul. Released on 9 May 2005 as the lead single from the band's second studio album, Demon Days, the single peaked at  2 in the United Kingdom and No. 14 in the United States, topping the US Billboard Modern Rock Tracks chart for eight consecutive weeks and appearing on the Billboard Hot 100 year-end rankings for both 2005 and 2006. The song peaked within the top 10 in 15 countries, reaching No. 1 in Spain and Greece, and has been certified five times platinum in Canada and triple-platinum in the United Kingdom.

The song was listed in Pitchfork Media and Rolling Stones Best Songs of the 2000s. "Feel Good Inc." was nominated for three Grammys at the 2006 Grammy Awards, including Record of the Year, ultimately winning for Best Pop Collaboration. Popdose ranked it 26th on their list of 100 best songs of the decade.

Music video

Background
The main themes of the video are intellectual freedom and the media's dumbing down of mass culture. Jamie Hewlett said in an interview that the inspiration for some scenes in the video came from Hayao Miyazaki; specifically, the windmill-powered landmass, which has been compared to that of Miyazaki's Castle in the Sky. On 26 April 2022, the video was re-uploaded to the Gorillaz YouTube channel with commentary from virtual band member Murdoc Niccals.

Synopsis
At the beginning of the video, the camera rises up to the top of the Feel Good Inc. tower, and a sample of the Spacemonkeyz dub of "Clint Eastwood", entitled "A Fistful of Peanuts", can be heard. The camera focuses into the tower, where 2-D yearns for the freedom to join Noodle on her floating island. The characters lying on the floor represent those who have already been "dumbed down", while the band members are the ones who have awakened. 2-D attempts to awaken all the people lying on the floor from their half-dead state by yelling at them through his megaphone, in the style of a political activist. Ominous helicopters, which closely resemble Korean War-era Bell H-13s, chase the floating island, monitoring the behaviour inside and ensuring that no one escapes. It is unclear whether they are preventing Noodle's escape or are chasing her away.

Back in the tower, De La Soul appear as larger-than life, seemingly omnipotent images on surrounding television screens, taunting the Gorillaz band members and driving 2-D into a wild, hypnotic frenzy as he tries to resist the urge to be dumbed down. At the end of the video, 2-D, beaten by his surroundings, returns to the state he was in when the video began, repeating the words "Feel good" until the video finally ends, in an exact reversal of the intro. The repetition of "Feel good" represents that 2-D is convincing himself that everything is OK (as if he is brainwashing himself to believe it), instead of confronting the harsh truth of the situation. The music video for "El Mañana" continues the narrative, depicting two helicopter gunships catching up to Noodle's floating windmill island and attacking it.

Awards and nominations

Awards
 2005 MTV Video Music Awards
 Breakthrough Video
 Best Special Effects in a Video
 2006 Grammy Awards
 Best Pop Collaboration with Vocals

Nominations
 2006 Grammy Awards
 Record of the Year
 Best Short Form Music Video

Track listings

UK CD single
 "Feel Good Inc." – 3:42
 "Spitting Out the Demons" – 5:10

UK DVD single
 "Feel Good Inc." (music video) – 4:13
 "Spitting Out the Demons" – 5:10
 "Bill Murray" – 3:51

UK 7-inch single
A. "Feel Good Inc." – 3:42
B. "68 State" – 4:48

European maxi-CD single
 "Feel Good Inc." – 3:42
 "Spitting Out the Demons" – 5:10
 "Bill Murray" – 3:51
 "Feel Good Inc." (music video) – 4:13

Japanese CD EP
 "Feel Good Inc." – 3:42
 "Spitting Out the Demons" – 5:10
 "Bill Murray" – 3:51
 "Murdoc Is God" – 2:26
 "Feel Good Inc." (music video) – 4:13

US digital EP
 "Feel Good Inc." – 3:42
 "Spitting Out the Demons" – 5:09
 "Bill Murray" – 3:52
 "Dare" (Soulwax Remix) – 5:44

Credits and personnel

Credits are lifted from the European maxi-CD single and Demon Days liner notes.

Studios
 Recorded at Kong Studios (Essex, England) and 13 (London, England)
 Mixed at Pierce Rooms (London, England)
 Mastered at Masterdisk (New York City)

Song personnel
 Gorillaz – writing, production, mixing
 David Jolicoeur – writing
 De La Soul – featured vocals
 Simon Tong – additional guitar
 Danger Mouse – production, mixing, programming
 Jason Cox – additional production, mixing, engineering
 James Dring – additional production, programming
 Howie Weinberg – mastering
 J.C. Hewett – artwork and design
 Zombie Flesh Eaters – artwork and design

Video personnel
 Jamie Hewlett – director
 Pete Candeland – director
 Passion Pictures – production
 Rushes – post production
 Chu-Li Shewring – sound design
 Sebastian Monk – sound design

Charts

Weekly charts

Year-end charts

Sales and certifications

Release history

References

External links
 Pitchfork Media review 3/25/2005 
 Music video from official fansite

2005 singles
2005 songs
De La Soul songs
Funk rock songs
Gorillaz songs
Grammy Award for Best Pop Collaboration with Vocals
Internet memes introduced in 2016
Number-one singles in Greece
Number-one singles in Spain
Parlophone singles
Rap rock songs
Songs about freedom
Song recordings produced by Danger Mouse (musician)
Songs written by Damon Albarn
Songs written by David Jude Jolicoeur
Virgin Records singles